Katlynn Loretta Fraine (born December 3, 1987) is an American soccer goalkeeper who plays for Swedish Damallsvenskan club Eskilstuna United. Fraine graduated from University of Florida and spent the 2011 season with Women's Professional Soccer (WPS) club Atlanta Beat. She moved to Sweden in 2012 and played successfully for Mallbackens IF and Linköpings FC before joining Vittsjö in December 2015.

Playing career

Club

Tampa Bay Hellenic, 2008
She made eight appearances for newly-formed USL W-League club Tampa Bay Hellenic in the 2008 season.

Atlanta Beat, 2011
Fraine was drafted by the Washington Freedom during the fourth round of the 2011 WPS Draft. She was one of two goalkeepers selected during the draft. After a change in team ownership to magicJack (WPS) and move to Florida, Fraine was later picked up by the Atlanta Beat but did not make an appearance for the club, although she was on the roster throughout the 2011 season.

Damallsvenskan: 2012–present 
After the WPS folded in early 2012, Fraine signed with Swedish club Mallbackens IF and helped the team get promoted to the Damallsvenskan for the 2013 season. During her debut season with the club in the second-division league Söderettan, Fraine made 23 appearances (all starts) and helped the club finish first in the league with a  record. After defeating Sirius in the promotions playoffs, Mallbackens was promoted to top-division league, Damallsvenskan. During the 2013 season, Fraine made 22 appearances for the club. They finished in 11th place with a  record.

Fraine signed with Damallsvenskan club Linköping FC for the 2014 season and made 19 appearances for the club for total of 1687 minutes. They finished in fourth place during the regular season with  record. She returned to Linköping for the 2015 season and helped the team finish in fourth place with a  record.

In December 2015, it was announced that Fraine had signed with Vittsjö GIK for the 2016 season.
She moved to Norwegian Toppserien team Avaldsnes IL for 2017, before returning to the Damallsvenskan with Växjö DFF a year later.

International
Fraine was called into a United States women's national under-23 soccer team training camp in summer 2010. She remains eligible for the Republic of Ireland women's national football team due to her Irish American heritage.

References

External links

 Katie Fraine profile at Linköpings FC 
 Florida Gators player profile
 
 

1987 births
Living people
Florida Gators women's soccer players
Atlanta Beat (WPS) players
American women's soccer players
Women's association football goalkeepers
American expatriate women's soccer players
Expatriate women's footballers in Sweden
Damallsvenskan players
Mallbackens IF players
Linköpings FC players
Vittsjö GIK players
American expatriate sportspeople in Sweden
University of Florida alumni
Växjö DFF players
Avaldsnes IL players
Toppserien players
American expatriate sportspeople in Norway
Expatriate women's footballers in Norway
Tampa Bay Hellenic players
USL W-League (1995–2015) players